Needmore is an unincorporated community in Clinton Township, Vermillion County, in the U.S. state of Indiana.

History
Needmore was founded in 1904.

Geography

References

Unincorporated communities in Vermillion County, Indiana
Unincorporated communities in Indiana